"I'll save you" is Fayray's 8th single. It was released on March 28, 2001 and peaked at #24. The song was used in a commercial for Kanebo's "KATE" cosmetics line.

Track listing
I'll save you
Us
La Vie En Rose (バラ色の人生) (Barairo no Jinsei; Life in pink)

Charts 
"I'll save you" - Oricon Sales Chart (Japan)

External links
FAYRAY OFFICIAL SITE

2001 singles
Fayray songs
2001 songs